The Marian Anderson Award was originally established in 1943 by African American singer Marian Anderson after she was awarded the $10,000 Bok Prize that year by the city of Philadelphia. Anderson used the award money to establish a singing competition to help support young singers; recipients of which include Camilla Williams (1943, 1944), Nathaniel Dickerson (1944), Louise Parker (1944), Eudice Mesibov, née Charney (1946), Rawn Spearman (1949), Georgia Laster (1951), Betty Allen (1952), Gloria Davy (1952), Judith Raskin (1952, 1953), Shirlee Emmons (1953), Miriam Holman (1954), Willis Patterson (1956), Shirley Verrett (1957), Joanna Simon (1962), Billie Lynn Daniel (1963), and Joyce Mathis (1967). Eventually, the prize fund ran out of money and it was disbanded. Florence Quivar was the last recipient of this earlier award in 1976.

In 1990, the award was re-established and has dispensed $25,000 annually. In 1998, the prize was restructured with the "Marian Anderson Award" going to an established artist, not necessarily a singer, who exhibits leadership in a humanitarian area. A separate prize, the "Marian Anderson Prize for Emerging Classical Artists" is given to promising young classical singers.

Awardees by year:

 1990 – Sylvia McNair
 1991 – Denyce Graves
 1992 – Philip Zawisza
 1993 – Nancy Maultsby
 1994 – Patricia Racette
 1995 – Michelle DeYoung
 1996 – Nathan Gunn
 1997 – Marguerite Krull
 1998 – Harry Belafonte
 1999 – Gregory Peck
 2000 – Elizabeth Taylor
 2001 – Quincy Jones
 2002 – Danny Glover
 2003 – Oprah Winfrey
 2005 – Ruby Dee and Ossie Davis
 2006 – Sidney Poitier
 2007 – Richard Gere
 2008 – Maya Angelou and Norman Lear
 2009 – Bill Cosby (Rescinded)
 2011 – Mia Farrow
 2012 – James Earl Jones
 2013 – Berry Gordy
 2014 – Jon Bon Jovi
 2015 – Wynton Marsalis
 2016 – Patti LaBelle and Gamble and Huff
 2017 – Dionne Warwick
 2018 – Queen Latifah
 2019 – Kool & the Gang

References

American music awards
1943 establishments in Pennsylvania
Humanitarian and service awards
Arts awards in the United States